Marco Zacchera (born 10 October 1951 in Verbania) is an Italian politician.

He was elected at the Chamber of Deputies for five legislatures (XII, XIII, XIV, XV, XVI) with the right-wing parties National Alliance (1994, 1996, 2001, 2006) and The People of Freedom (2008).

Zacchera served as Mayor of Verbania from June 2009 to April 2013.

See also
List of mayors of Verbania

References

External links

Living people
1951 births
National Alliance (Italy) politicians
The People of Freedom politicians
21st-century Italian politicians
Mayors of Verbania
People from Verbania